Fred G. Moritt (October 5, 1905 – May 15, 1995) was an American lawyer, singer, composer, lyricist and politician from New York.

Life
He was born on October 5, 1905, in New York City. He attended Public School No. 9 in Brooklyn, and Boys High School. He graduated from New York University and Brooklyn Law School, and practiced law in New York City. In 1933, he abandoned his law practice, and began a career as a singer (with baritone voice) on the stage and over the radio. In 1934, he returned to his law practice, and entered politics as a Democrat. He also wrote more than 60 songs.

Moritt was a member of the New York State Assembly (Kings Co., 17th D.) in 1938, 1939–40, 1941–42 and 1943–1944.

He was a member of the New York State Senate from 1945 to 1957, sitting in the 165th, 166th, 167th, 168th, 169th, 170th and 171st New York State Legislatures. He resigned his seat on September 13, 1957, and in November was elected to the New York City Municipal Court (4th D.).

He was a justice of the Municipal Court from 1958 to 1962, and of the New York City Civil Court from 1962 to 1975. On March 6, 1960, he married Skye Muller, an airline stewardess, and their daughter is Rabbi Leana Moritt.

In 1960, Fred Moritt wrote the lyrics and the score of a musical version of The Barretts of Wimpole Street under the title The Third Kiss which however never reached the stage. In 1974, State Special Anti-Corruption Prosecutor Maurice H. Nadjari investigated the financing of an attempted production of this musical, accusing Moritt of having used the $18,500-a-year salary (paid by the city) of his law secretary for this purpose. On April 17, 1974, Moritt filed criminal charges against Nadjari for harassment, and demanded Nadjari be arrested. On the next day, Moritt was arrested, and indicted by a grand jury under instructions by Nadjari for conspiracy, perjury, grand larceny and witness-tampering. On May 6, 1974, Moritt pleaded not guilty. In February 1975, Moritt retired from the bench. On April 14, 1975, Moritt sued Nadjari and 12 other people involved in the indictment for $150,000,000 in damages. In September 1975, a federal court in Brooklyn allowed Moritt to proceed with his suit against Nadjari for prosecutorial misconduct. On August 12, 1976, the New York Supreme Court, Appellate Division ruled that Nadjari had no jurisdiction to prosecute in this case, and that the result of his investigation should have been handed over to the District Attorney of Kings County. Moritt tried to take his case to the U.S. Supreme Court, but in October 1976, the court declined to hear it. The case against Moritt was dismissed in February 1977.

He died on May 15, 1995.

Sources

External links
 The Fred G. Moritt Papers are in the New York State Modern Political Archive of the M. E. Grenander Department of Special Collections & Archives, University at Albany, SUNY
 Rabbi Leana Moritt at Thresholds for the Jewishly Curious

1905 births
1995 deaths
Politicians from Brooklyn
Democratic Party New York (state) state senators
Democratic Party members of the New York State Assembly
Brooklyn Law School alumni
New York (state) state court judges
20th-century American lawyers
20th-century American judges
Boys High School (Brooklyn) alumni
20th-century American politicians